This is a list of African-American newspapers that have been published in Iowa. 

The first African-American newspaper in Iowa was the Colored Advance of Corning, Iowa, founded in 1882.  It was followed the next year by the Des Moines Rising Son.  By far the longest-lasting, however, was the Iowa Bystander, which spanned more than a century.

During the peak period of African-American newspaper founding in the late 19th and early 20th centuries, the African American population in Iowa was less than 20,000.  As a result, the number of such papers established in Iowa is much lower than in some neighboring states such as Illinois.

A hotspot of African American newspaper publishing in the early 20th century was Buxton, a coal-mining town that no longer exists.  Around eight African-American newspapers were published there in the first decades of the 20th century.

Newspapers

See also
List of African-American newspapers and media outlets
List of African-American newspapers in Illinois
List of African-American newspapers in Minnesota
List of African-American newspapers in Missouri
List of African-American newspapers in Nebraska

Works cited

References

Newspapers
Iowa
African-American
African-American newspapers